Castlereagh Upper (named after the former barony of Castlereagh) is a historic barony in County Down, Northern Ireland. It was created by 1841 with the division of Castlereagh into two. It is bordered by eight other baronies: Castlereagh Lower and Dufferin to the east; Lecale Lower and Kinelarty to the south; Iveagh Lower, Lower Half, Iveagh Lower, Upper Half, and Massereene Upper to the west; and Belfast Upper to the north.

List of settlements
Below is a list of settlements in Castlereagh Upper:

Cities
Belfast
Lisburn

Towns
Carryduff

Villages
Kilmore
Saintfield

Population centres
Ballymacarrett
Newtownbreda

List of civil parishes
Below is a list of civil parishes in Castlereagh Upper:
Blaris (also partly in baronies of Iveagh Lower, Upper Half and Massereene Upper)
Comber (also partly in barony of Castlereagh Lower)
Drumbeg (also partly in barony of Belfast Upper)
Drumbo
Killaney
Killinchy (also partly in baronies of Castlereagh Lower and Dufferin)
Killyleagh (one townland, rest in barony of Dufferin)
Kilmore (also partly in barony of Kinelarty)
Knockbreda (also partly in barony of Castlereagh Lower)
Lambeg (also partly in barony of Belfast Upper)
Saintfield

References

 
Clandeboye